Harness racing in New Zealand is primarily a professional sport which involves pacing and trotting competitions for Standardbred racehorses. The difference is the horse's gait or running style:

 pacing is where the two legs on the same side of the horse move forward at the same time, and
 trotting is where the horse moves its two diagonally opposite legs forward at the same time.

In New Zealand the majority of standardbred races are for pacers and the most lucrative races are in that gait. Pacers are generally faster than trotters. However, harness racing is still often called trotting as that was the sport's traditional name.

History

Trotting races were held as part of the programme of some of the galloping meetings in the Otago Southland area as early as 1864. The first totalisators were introduced about this time. They faced opposition from a curious alliance of bookmakers and anti-gambling factions but were approved by the Clubs and licensed by the Colonial Secretary. The first trotting race on a racecourse in Canterbury, in 1875, before the totalisator was introduced, the stake was only about a "tenner" (£10), but the match created a lot of interest. About 1880, Lower Heathcote Racing Club was founded, supporting gallops, but added trotting events to its programme, giving smaller stakes. Some years later the club discontinued gallops and became the Lower Heathcote Trotting Club, which gave stakes ranging from £15 to £35.

The New South Wales bred, Lawn Derby, racing un-hoppled, was the first pacer to break the two-minute barrier in Australia or New Zealand when he recorded 1:59.4 at the Addington track in New Zealand in 1938.

From these early stages, the sport has developed with top races and top horses from then right up to the present day.

Racing rules 
In New Zealand the metric distances are used. Races are at distances between 1600m and 3200m.

In New Zealand racing the leader does not have to hand up the lead to any horse that challenges, often leaving a horse parked outside the leader in the "death seat", "the death", or "facing the breeze", which results in this horse covers more ground than the leader.

New Zealand races may have a field of up to 16 horses, although as numbers of horses have reduced some races will have less than 10 starters.  This generally means that with the smaller tracks a "three wide train" starts as the field gets the bell to signal their final lap.

There is a system of an 'open lane' or 'passing lane' ('sprint lane' in Australia). These lanes do not operate on all tracks and have been a point of argument between many industry participants.

New Zealand horses are able to easily "cross the Tasman" to Australia, and Australian horses often compete in major New Zealand races.

In 2021 New Zealand aligned the deemed birth date of horses from 1 August to 1 January.

Prominent New Zealand pacers

The following are some of New Zealand's greatest pacers and races they have won.

Key for 3-year-old and Australian races:

 NZSS - New Zealand Sires Stakes
 GND - Great Northern Derby
 NZD - New Zealand Trotting Derby
 NSWD - New South Wales Derby
 QuD - Queensland Derby
 MM - Miracle Mile Pace
 HC - A G Hunter Cup
 VC - Victoria Cup
 WAPC - Western Australian Pacing Cup

Prominent New Zealand trotters

The following are some of New Zealand's greatest trotters and races they have won:

Prominent people

The following are some notable people in New Zealand harness racing history:

Major New Zealand harness races 

In New Zealand the richest and most important race is the New Zealand Trotting Cup, run for open class pacers in November at Addington Raceway. Other major races include the Auckland Trotting Cup as well as the Noel J Taylor Memorial Mile and the New Zealand Messenger Championship for four-year-olds. There are also the New Zealand Derby and the Great Northern Derby for three-year-olds, and the Dominion Handicap and Rowe Cup for trotters. The Harness Jewels raceday (the end-of year championships for two-, three- and four-year-olds) takes place in late May or early June

A marquee event is the annual series which takes place between New Zealand and Australia called the Inter Dominion. The series, which includes a pacing series and a trotting series, is held yearly and rotated around the Australian State Controlling Bodies and once every four years the Inter Dominion Championships are held in New Zealand.

There is also the Australasian Pacers Grand Circuit in which each year points are awarded for placings in the major races in Australia and New Zealand to determine the overall winner.

Harness racing clubs and courses of New Zealand

Harness racing is held throughout New Zealand, including courses in some of the smaller centres.  The following trotting clubs were listed in the 1972 DB Trotting Annual.

The Amberley Racing Club also held trotting races at Amberley Racecourse and eventually an Amberley TC was formed and held trotting meetings.  When the Amberley racecourse closed in 1973 the club then held meetings at Rangiora in February and September 1974 and conducted Equalisator meetings at its qualifying trials meetings through until 1980.  The Amberley TC held its first full Totalisator meeting on the 23rd of January 1994.

United States and Canada 
The association with trotting in New Zealand and the United States has always been strong, with much of the breeding stock coming from America. Particularly in the 1950s and 1960s, New Zealand horses competed in both Canada and the United States. The first New Zealand horse to be raced in America by a New Zealander was the trotter Vodka, the winner of the 1953 Dominion Handicap. He was taken there in 1956 by his owner, J. S. Shaw, won 11 races and was later leased to American interests.

In 1960 Caduceus was the first New Zealand pacer to compete in the Yonkers International Series with his trainer-driver, J. D. Litten. Despite his nine years, Caduceus showed he was the equal of the top American horses, winning the last race of the series, only to be disqualified. He also was leased to American interests and at 10 years of age was still winning races.

False Step was driven in the Yonkers International series during the 1960–61 season by his trainer C C Devine. False Step's performances showed he was one of the greatest pacers in the world. He beat the acknowledged American champion, Adios Butler, in a 1½ mile race. He was sold in America for 115,000 dollars, the fifth-highest price paid for a pacer in the United States.

Arania also entered the series with False Step. She did not do well, but after being leased won several races and proved she was able to race with the best in America, and in fact created a record of 1 min 57 sec for 1 mile in the Lexington Red Mile.

In 1964, Cardigan Bay was to travel to America with reinsman Stanley Dancer, who paid 100,000 dollars for the horse. Cardigan Bay was already an established racehorse in New Zealand, having won the 1963 New Zealand Trotting Cup and other top races in Australia and New Zealand. He went on to win over a million dollars in the United States, the first harness horse ever to do so.

See also

Harness racing
Harness racing in Australia
Horse racing
Glossary of Australian and New Zealand punting
Thoroughbred racing in New Zealand

References

External links

Racing, Trotting, from An Encyclopaedia of New Zealand